Operation Northern Lights was a United States operation during the Iraq War. It may also refer to:
Operation Nordlicht (1942)
Operation Nordlicht (1944–45)